Sakrand (Urdu: سکرنڈ, Sindhi: سڪرنڊ) is a town in the Sindh province of Pakistan.  
Sakrand is a taluka of the district Shaheed Benazirabad (erstwhile Nawabshah), about 18 kilometers from the old Nawabshah city. By road it is a three-and-a-half-hour drive from Karachi on National Highway and one-and-a-half-hour drive from Hyderabad on National Highway. It is rich in Agriculture. It is a business town, exporting goods to Hyderabad, Sindh, and Nawabshah.

History

The historical town of Saklund is populated on both sides of National Highway, which was called Rawr ( راوڙ وارو رستو), in old times. Whereas in the periods of the Talpur dynasty and British rule, it was called Tapali Rasto (ٽپالي رستو). In the initial time of British rule it was called Naar waro rasto. Sindhu darya flows about 18 km on the western side of Sakrand. There are various such signs from where it's clearly recognized that this old town is populated at the present location. Sakrand was previously a sub-division headquarter of Nawabshah.

An important historical town due to the ruling periods of Kalhora rule and Talpur rule, Major General Haig mentions Sakrand in his book (The Indus Delta Country), whereas  Albert William Hughes in his book, Sindh Gazetteer, has also mentioned the historical importance of Sakrand

Transport
Sakrand is home to Sakrand Junction railway station, that is abandoned by the Pakistan railway.

Trade and business

Sakrand Sugar Mill Ltd. has a crushing capacity of 6,500 metric tons of sugarcane per day. The sugar mill not only fulfills domestic demand but it also has the capacity to export to other towns of the province.

A newspaper, Sakrand Times, is published from Karachi.
Iqbal flour mill, Nawabshah Road, Sakrand
Anwer Ali Khero flour mill, Gt Road, Sakrand
All Pakistan Banana and Furit market, Nawabshah Road, Sakrand
 All Sarafa Association, Sarafa Bazaar, Sakrand
 Imtiaz MObile ZOne, Ibrar Market, Sakrand

Education 
 Shaheed Benazir Bhutto University of Veterinary and Animal Sciences 
 Government High School Sakrand, Nawabshah
 Sachal Foundation College, Kainat Nagar, Sakrand
 Academy of Excellence School near Sayed Villa, Khanzada Muhalla, Sakrand
 Ad Dawaah School near lakha House, Sakrand
 Amanullah Noonari Karate School and Club, Main Road, Sakrand 03063203218
 Government Boys Degree College Sakrand
 Agricultural Training Institute College, Hyderabad Road, Sakrand
 Mehran Public School, Sindhri Chowk, Sakrand
 Modern Public School near Chandio Pso, Sakrand
 City Foundation School near Jhanda Gali, Sakrand
 Millat Public School near Lilla Abad, Sakrand
 Super Track Public School, Lilla Abad, Sakrand
 Super English School, Azeem Colony, Sakrand
 Bhoongar Public School, Azeem Colony, Sakrand
 Government Girls Degree College Sakrand
 Government Girls High School No. 1, Srhari Road, Sakrand
 Government Girls High School No. 2, Hospital Road, Sakrand
 Jinnah Public School, Qazi Ahmed Road, Sakrand
 G R Unar Public School, Tanki Wali Gali, Sakrand
 Egale Public School, Jhanda Gali, Sakrand
 Government Shabbir Ahmed Shah Boys Morning And Evening School Sakrand 
 Government Old Main Sindhi School, Old Sakrand, since 1902
 Oxford Public School, Mehar Colony, Sakrand
 Sindh Leadership School Junior, Qazi Ahmed Road, Sakrand
 Sindh Leadership School Senior, Wapda Colony, Sakrand

References

External links
Cotton Research Institute
Sakrand history

 wheat research canter nawabshah road sakrand
 village majeed keerio
 village haji abdul qadir noonari 
 village natho keerio
 village mehar ali jamali
 village mari jalbani
 village sahib khan jalalani

Populated places in Shaheed Benazir Abad District
Towns in Pakistan